The Mendip Hills, (Mendips) in northern Somerset, are the most southerly Carboniferous Limestone uplands in Britain.

The Mendips comprise three major anticlinal structures, each with a core of older Devonian sandstone and Silurian volcanic rocks. The latter, after crushing, is use in road construction and concrete. Devonian Sandstone is visible around Black Down and Downhead. Carboniferous Limestone, dominates the hills and surround the older rock formations. An outcrop of basalt is also quarried at Moon's Hill.

For centuries the stone of the Mendips, and the Cotswolds to the north, have been used to build the cities of Bristol and Bath, and many Somerset towns. As stone transportation is expensive, the Mendips, and Leicestershire, are important as the nearest sources of hard stone for London and the South East.

The Mendip quarries produce twelve million tonnes of stone a year, employ two thousand people, and have an annual turnover of £150m. Five million tonnes of stone per year is transported by Mendip Rail.

Active quarries

Disused quarries 

 Barnclose Quarry
 Brambleditch Quarry
 Cliff Quarry, Compton Martin
 Cloford Quarry — geological Site of Special Scientific Interest
 Cloud Quarry
 Cook's Wood Quarry — geological Site of Special Scientific Interest
 Draycott Quarry
 Emborough Quarries — geological Site of Special Scientific Interest
 Fairy Cave Quarry
 Hobbs Quarry — geological Site of Special Scientific Interest
 Holwell Quarries — geological Site of Special Scientific Interest
 Shipham Quarry
 Underwood Quarry (near Wells)
 Viaduct Quarry — geological Site of Special Scientific Interest
 Waterlip Quarry
 Westbury Quarry
 Windsor Hill Quarry — geological Site of Special Scientific Interest

References